Time is the fourth studio album by the Danish heavy metal band Mercyful Fate. It was released on 25 October 1994 by Metal Blade Records.

The track "The Mad Arab" is about H. P. Lovecraft's character Abdul Alhazred, the author of the fictional forbidden tome of occult lore The Necronomicon.  In the lyric booklet, it is subtitled "Part One: The Vision".  The second part appears as the track "Kutulu (The Mad Arab, Part Two)" on the follow-up, Into the Unknown.

Track listing

Personnel
Mercyful Fate
King Diamond – vocals, harpsichord, keyboards, producer, mixing
Hank Shermann – guitars, associate producer, mixing
Michael Denner – guitars
Sharlee D'Angelo – bass
Snowy Shaw – drums

Production
Tim Kimsey – producer, engineer, mixing
Kevin Wade – assistant engineer
Frank Salazar – pre-mastering
Eddy Schreyer – mastering at Future Disc, Los Angeles

References 

Mercyful Fate albums
1994 albums
Metal Blade Records albums
Cthulhu Mythos music